Tamils in France refer to the citizens as well as expatriate residents of Tamil origin living in France. Over 100,000 Tamils   from both Indian states of Tamil Nadu and Pondicherry now (Puducherry) and then from Sri Lanka also lives in France. This is in addition to the Indian Tamil community established in French overseas dominions of Réunion, Martinique, and French Guiana. There are nearly about 220000 people of Indian origin from Tamil Nadu lives in Réunion.

History

The earliest Tamil immigration into France can be traced back to since the 17th Century, from the French-administered colony of Puducherry in India. A large number of them hailing from middle-class families who joined the French government on service.

In the 1790s the French East India Company sent most of the Indian Tamils from Tamil Nadu and Puducherry to France and Réunion for workers and after some years they were permanently settled and makes an residence there itself. 

The later arrivals were mostly Tamils from Sri Lanka, who fled the country during the violence in 1983 and the Civil War that succeeded it. Today, there are about 50,000 Sri Lankan Tamils living in France, of which the greatest number live in Paris.

The Parisian Tamil community was fairly dispersed and disorderly until 1991, when Paris-based Tamils began to form tightly-knit networks centred in the northern reaches of Rue du Faubourg Saint-Denis. Tamil-owned businesses appeared in great numbers seemingly overnight, while the colorful Chariot Festival, a tribute to the Hindu elephant god Ganesha, has become a popular annual procession eagerly anticipated by thousands of Parisians. There are Tamil newspapers, a radio station, and a website dedicated to Paris' residents.

Culture

Language
Apart from speaking Tamil their native language, most of the Tamils are fluent speakers of English due to their British colonial past. Many of the early migrants had struggled to find work and higher education due to their relatively lesser understanding of the French. As a result, many of them have taken up free and paid classes to learn French. A critical demand is that the French government create special work-training programs designed to orient refugees from different fields.

The Tamil community preserve their culture by creating special schools for children. Today there are ten or eleven active branches in Paris and in the suburbs (banlieue). In these weekend classes, children are taught Tamil, traditional music and dance, and religion.

Religion
The majority of the Tamil French population are either Hindus or Christians, and a minor number of them have faith in Islam as well.

Little India
Passage Brady, nicknamed “Little India”, is divided in two by Boulevard de Strasbourg.  Covered on one side, it is open on the other. There are numerous boutiques and restaurants specialising in Gujarati, Tamil and Punjabi cuisine.

Little Jaffna

The Parisian quarter of La Chapelle,  a stone's throw from Le Gare du Nord is popularly known as  “Little Jaffna”. In only 10 years, "Little Jaffna", located at the last stretch of the winding street of Rue du Faubourg Saint-Denis in the 10th arrondissement, between metros Gare de Nord and La Chapelle, has sprung to life and begun to truly flourish.
Centring on three of four streets where the famous annual Ganesh Festival and its crowd drawing processions of dancers, rituals and floats has been celebrated at the end of August each year since the late 1990s the quarter is thriving and undeniably Tamil.

Majority of the residents are Sri Lankan Tamils who fled Sri Lanka from persecution in the 1980s, which also saw the beginning of the country's civil war. It is commonly mistakenly called by the average Parisian as Little India. 

The visitor will notice a wide variety of stores, restaurants and businesses catering to Paris Tamil community; There are numerous boutiques selling saris, restaurants specialising in Tamil, Indian and Sri Lankan cuisine, halal butchers and spice stores; there are shops selling models of Hindu, Buddhist and Christian deities; trinkets and jewellery for all tastes and wallets –  bangles for one Euro, rings for a thousand; all tastes in Indian film and music are catered for in various media outlets and many less stand -out stores, offering translation, visa, educational and other services also line the streets.

Both the area and event have become popular tourist attractions. Little Jaffna is a thriving village in its own right, offering a kind of Tamil cultural richness that seems curiously preserved from French influence.

Notable people

See also

 Malbars, a Tamil ethnic group in Réunion
 Indians in Guadeloupe
 Indo-Martiniquais
 Tamil diaspora

References

Asian diaspora in France
Ethnic groups in France
Indian diaspora in France
France
France